The Donalsonville Historic District in Donalsonville, Georgia is a  historic district that was listed on the National Register of Historic Places in 2002.

It includes 48 contributing buildings and seven other contributing structures.

It includes the Seminole County Courthouse, which is separately listed on the National Register.

References

Historic districts on the National Register of Historic Places in Georgia (U.S. state)
Beaux-Arts architecture in Georgia (U.S. state)
Buildings and structures completed in 1889
National Register of Historic Places in Seminole County, Georgia
Buildings designated early commercial in the National Register of Historic Places